Sarah Mills or Sara Mills may refer to:

Sarah Mills (Zixx), fictional character
Sarah Mills (Harper's Island), fictional character
Sarah Mills (water polo), played for Australia women's national water polo team
Sara Mills (linguist), English linguist